Canedo is a parish in Ribeira de Pena Municipality in Portugal. The population in 2011 was 390, in an area of 36.16 km2.

References

Freguesias of Ribeira de Pena